Trichophysetis microspila is a moth in the family Crambidae. It is found on Sumbawa.

References

Cybalomiinae
Moths described in 1894
Moths of Indonesia